Fallen arches may refer to:

 Flat feet
 Fallen Arches (radio show), 1988–89 radio show on BBC Radio 4
 Fallen Arches (film), 1998
 "Fallen Arches", 2000 episode of The Powerpuff Girls
 "Fallen Arches", 2006 episode of The Venture Bros.

See also
 
 
 Fallen (disambiguation)
 Arches (disambiguation)